Florida Agricultural and Mechanical University (FAMU), commonly known as Florida A&M, is a public historically black land-grant university in Tallahassee, Florida. Founded in 1887, It is the third largest historically black university in the United States by enrollment and the only public historically black university in Florida. It is a member institution of the State University System of Florida, as well as one of the state's land grant universities, and is accredited to award baccalaureate, master's and doctoral degrees by the Commission on Colleges of the Southern Association of Colleges and Schools.

FAMU sports teams are known as the Rattlers, and compete in Division I of the NCAA.  They are a member of the Southwestern Athletic Conference (SWAC).

History
Black abolitionist Jonathan C. Gibbs first introduced legislation to create the State Normal College for Colored Students in 1885, one year after being elected to the Florida Legislature. The date also reflects the new Florida Constitution of 1885, which prohibited racial integration in schools. The college was located in Tallahassee because Leon County and adjacent counties led the state in African-American population, reflecting Tallahassee's former status as the center of Florida's slave trade. (See Tallahassee's black history.) The site of the university is the 375-acre slave plantation of Florida governor William Pope Duval, whose mansion, today the site of the Carnegie Library, burned in 1905.

On October 3, 1887, the State Normal College for Colored Students began classes, and became a land-grant college four years later when it received $7,500 under the Second Morrill Act, and its name was changed to State Normal and Industrial College for Colored Students. However, it was not an official institution of higher learning until the 1905 Buckman Act, which transferred control from the Department of Education to the Board of Control, creating what was the foundation for the modern Florida A&M University. This same act is responsible for the creation of the University of Florida and Florida State University from their previous institutions. In 1909, the name of the college was once again changed, to Florida Agricultural and Mechanical College for Negroes, and in 1953 the name was finally changed to Florida Agricultural and Mechanical University. Florida A&M is the only surviving publicly funded historically black college or university in the state of Florida. (Twelve publicly-funded junior colleges serving primarily the African-American population of Florida existed for different periods between 1949 and 1966.)

In 1923, there was a student strike.

In 1951, the university started a pharmacy and nursing program. In order to give these students hands-on experience, the university built a hospital. Until 1971 Florida A&M Hospital was the only one within  of Tallahassee to serve African Americans. It closed in 1971, after then-Tallahassee Memorial Hospital, under federal pressure, started serving African Americans.

On May 26, 1956, Wilhemina Jakes and Carrie Patterson, two Florida A&M University students, were arrested by the Tallahassee Police Department for "placing themselves in a position to incite a riot" which lead to the Tallahassee bus boycott which sought to end racial segregation in the employment and seating arrangements of city buses.

In 1963, FAMU students demonstrated against segregation in the city.

In 1992, 1995, and 1997, FAMU successfully recruited more National Achievement Scholars than Harvard.  FAMU tied with Harvard in 2000, recruiting 62 new National Achievement Scholars, although by 2006 that number had declined to one. The National Achievement Scholarship Corporation discontinued naming scholars in 2015.

In the fall of 1997, FAMU was selected as the Time-Princeton Review "College of the Year" and was cited in 1999 by Black Issues in Higher Education for awarding more baccalaureate degrees to African-Americans than any institution in the nation.

In 2011 Robert Champion, a band member, was beaten to death in a hazing incident. Two faculty members resigned in connection with a hazing investigation and thirteen people were charged with felony or misdemeanor hazing crimes; one student, a band member, was convicted of manslaughter and hazing charges and sentenced to six years in prison. The scandal resulted in the resignation of FAMU's president and played a role in the university's regional accreditor, the Southern Association of Colleges and Schools, placing FAMU on probation for one year.

In 2019, FAMU and other HBCUs developed a partnership with Adtalem Global Education and its for-profit Ross University School of Medicine in Barbados.

Presidents

 Thomas Desaille Tucker 1887–1901
 Nathan B. Young 1901–1923
 William A. Howard 1923–1924
 John Robert Edward Lee 1924–1944
 J.B. Bragg April 5, 1944 – September 1, 1944
 William H. Gray, Jr. 1944–1949
 H. Manning Efferson July 7, 1949 – April 1, 1950
 George W. Gore 1950–1968
 Benjamin L. Perry, Jr. 1968–1977
 Walter L. Smith 1977–1985
 Frederick S. Humphries 1985–2001 
 Henry Lewis III January 2002 – June 2002
 Fred Gainous 2002–2004
 Castell V. Bryant January 2005 – May 2007
 James H. Ammons July 2, 2007 – July 16, 2012
 Elmira Mangum April 1, 2014 – September 15, 2016 
 Larry Robinson November 30, 2017 – present (interim: May–July 2007, July 2012 – April 2014, September 2016 – November 2017)

Academics
The university offers 54 bachelor's degrees, 29 master's degrees, one professional degree, and 12 doctoral degrees. It has 14 schools and colleges. Florida A&M also has an honors program for high-achieving undergraduate students who meet the high performance criteria. FAMU is a member school of the Thurgood Marshall Scholarship Fund.

In 2012, FAMU implemented the Medical Scholars Program (MSP) in partnership with the Charles E. Schmidt College of Medicine.  MSP is a pre-medical program designed to prepare academically talented undergraduate students for success in medical school and beyond. There is a cap of 10 freshmen accepted into this competitive four-year program each year.

FAMU has nine fully funded, endowed, eminent-scholars chairs, including two in the School of Journalism and Graphic Communications, four in the School of Business & Industry, one in the College of Education, one in Arts and Sciences, and one in its School of Pharmacy.

Colleges and Schools
FAMU offers undergraduate and graduate degrees through the following colleges and schools:

College of Agriculture and Food Sciences
College of Education
FAMU - FSU College of Engineering
College of Law
College of Pharmacy and Pharmaucetical Sciences, Institute of Public Health
College of Social Scienes, Arts, and Humanities
College of Science and Technology
School of Allied Health Sciences
School of Architecture and Engineering Technology 
School of Business and Industry
School of the Environment
School of Graduate Studies and Research
School of Journalism and Graphic Communication
School of Nursing

Admissions
The fall 2020 incoming freshmen class had an average GPA of 3.44 and an average SAT score of 1082.

Demographics

Florida A&M University student enrollment population consists primarily of undergraduates. 83% of the school's enrolled students are African-American. The next largest demographic group is White (non-Hispanic) students at 7%, followed by Hispanic students at 6%. Multiracial, Asian, Native American, and international students round out the remaining 4%.

Accreditation
Florida A&M University has been accredited by the Southern Association of Colleges and Schools (SACS) since 1935.

Graduation rate
In 2020, FAMU's four-year graduation rate was 21%, while its six-year graduation rate was 55%.

Rankings

The 2022 edition of the U.S. News & World Report college rankings placed 202nd among national universities, 117th among public universities, seventh among HBCUs, and first among public HBCUs. FAMU was also named 61st in best Graduate Teaching and 20th in the Top Performers in Social Mobility category.

It is classified among "R2: Doctoral Universities – High research activity".

For 2017, the National Science Foundation ranked Florida A&M University 216th nationally and 2nd among HBCUs for total research and development expenditures.

Research
FAMU's annual research funding is $44.5 million. The university has access to research funding from many Federal agencies. FAMU's two largest research areas are agriculture and health sciences. The Pharmacy College's research funding is $20.2 million ($20.2 million in federal, $300k in state support, and from $300k in private industry support) with $29,281,352 committed.

Campus
FAMU's main campus is in Tallahassee, Florida, just south of the State Capitol and the campus of Florida State University. It also has a law school campus in Orlando, Florida, and the Research and Development Center in Quincy, Florida. The College of Pharmacy has extension campuses in Miami, Jacksonville, Tampa and Crestview, Florida.

Residential facilities
Exceptions to this rule include married students, students with dependents, and students who are of age 21 by the start of classes.

FAMU offers a limited number of rooms for students with dependent families. Family households may occupy rooms in the Palmetto North Apartments. Residents are zoned to Leon County Schools. Residents are zoned to Bond Elementary School, Nims Middle School, and Leon High School.

National historic district

 consists of 132 buildings spread across . Part of the campus is listed on the U.S. National Register of Historic Places as the Florida Agricultural and Mechanical College Historic District. It received that designation on May 9, 1996. The district is centered along the section of Martin Luther King Boulevard that goes through the campus. One campus building, the old Carnegie Library, is listed separately on the National Register. On April 18, 2012, the AIA's Florida Chapter placed Lee Hall at Florida Agricultural & Mechanical University (FAMU) on its list of Florida Architecture: 100 Years. 100 Places.

Research centers and institutes
The Division of Research houses 17 different research centers and institutes:
Center for Biological Control
Center for Disability Access and Resources
Center for Environmental Equity and Justice
Environmental Cooperative Sciences Center (ECSC)
Center for Intelligent Systems, Control, and Robotics (CISCOR)
Center for International Agricultural Trade, Developmentg Research and Training
Center for International Law and Justice
Center for Plasma Science and Technology
Center for Viticulture Science and Small Fruit Research
Center for Water and Air Quality
Center for Secure Computing and Information Assistance
Meek-Eaton Southeastern Regional Black Archives Research Center and Museum
Small Business Development Center
Institute for Building Sciences
Juvenile Justice Research Institute
Institute for Research in Music and Entertainment Industry Studies
Institute of Public Health

Libraries
The Samuel H. Coleman Memorial Library is the university's main library, named for the man who served as the university's general alumni president for 14 years. After the university's main building containing administrative offices, cafeteria, and library were destroyed by fire, Andrew Carnegie donated a $10,000 gift for the construction of a new library facility. The construction of Coleman Library began during the post-World War II era. The new library was officially dedicated during FAMU's 1949 annual Founders Day celebration in honor of civil leader Samuel H. Coleman. The library was built in 1948, renovated in 1972, expanded in 1990 and again in 2004. The  facility includes study rooms, a student study lounge and cafe, graduate and faculty study carrels, teleconference rooms, and a state-of-the-art information literacy classroom.

The libraries hold nearly 2 million volumes, over 155,000 e-books and e-journals, and 256,126 microforms.

Carnegie Library
The library of what was then the State Normal and Industrial College for Colored Students was located in the grandest building on the campus, Duval Hall, the former mansion of Florida Governor William Pope Duval, which also held the university's administrative offices and cafeteria. It was destroyed by fire in 1905. Andrew Carnegie donated a $10,000 gift for the construction of a new library facility.
In 1907, when the city of Tallahassee turned down philanthropist Andrew Carnegie's offer of a library building, because by his rules it would have had to serve black patrons, Carnegie funded instead the Carnegie Library at FAMU. It no longer serves as a library, but instead houses the Southeastern Regional Black Archives Research Center and Museum.

Athletics

Florida A&M University is a member of the Southwestern Athletic Conference and participates in NCAA Division I-FCS.  FAMU's sports teams are called the Rattlers.  FAMU offers men's sports in baseball, basketball, cross country, football, golf, tennis and track and field.  It offers women's sports in basketball, bowling, cheerleading, cross country, softball, tennis, track and field and volleyball.

From 1938 to 1961, the football team won the Black College National Championship eight times, including six times under head coach Jake Gaither, in 1950, 1952, 1954, 1957, 1959 and 1961. When Gaither retired after 25 years of coaching in 1969, his FAMU teams had a 203-36-4 (wins-losses-ties) record, for a .844 winning percentage. Thirty-six players from Gaither's teams were All-Americans, and 42 went on to play in the National Football League. During his 25 years as head coach, FAMU won 22 Southern Intercollegiate Athletic Conference championships. Gaither was elected to the College Football Hall of Fame in 1975. FAMU went on to win the first NCAA D1-AA National Championship in 1978 after defeating the University of Massachusetts Amherst.

The men's basketball team has qualified for the opening round game of the NCAA men's basketball tournament three times (1999, 2004 and 2007).
The FAMU Wrestling Team placed third in their region and had several national placers in 2008 under Coach Sharif.

Student life

FAMU is one of the largest HBCUs in the nation with a student body of nearly 10,000 students hailing from all regions of the United States and several foreign countries. Individuals part of the FAMU community are affectionately referred to as "FAMUly" or members of "Rattler Nation". FAMU has over 100 student organizations on campus.

Notable student organizations

Student Government Association
The Student Government Association (SGA) is the official voice of the student body and is divided into three branches: Executive, Judicial, and Legislative.

FAMU Royal Court
Miss FAMU, Mister FAMU, and other students represent the university in its royal court. Miss FAMU, Mister FAMU, and female students known as "attendants", are elected by the student body; there is a Freshman, Sophomore, Junior, Senior, Graduate attendant and Queen of Orange and Green. The male "escorts" of the attendants are appointed by Mister FAMU through an application process. The only male escort that wears a crown besides Mister FAMU is the King of Orange and Green. The attendants and escorts are undergraduate students, except for one attendant and one escort who are graduate students.

Gospel Choir
The FAMU Gospel Choir was established in 1957.

Reserve Officers Training Corps
FAMU is home to both Army ROTC and Naval ROTC units, permitting students to pursue careers as commissioned officers in the U.S. Army, U.S. Navy, and U.S. Marine Corps, upon graduation. For those FAMU students desiring to become commissioned officers in the U.S. Air Force, a cross-campus arrangement permits their taking Air Force ROTC training with the AFROTC detachment at nearby Florida State University (FSU). Likewise, Florida State students desiring to become Navy and Marine Corps officers may also enroll with FAMU's NROTC unit under a similar arrangement.

Marching band

The FAMU marching band, The Marching 100, received national recognition in January 1993 when it performed in the 42nd Presidential Inauguration Parade by invitation of Bill Clinton. The band has also performed in the Super Bowl and in the 44th Presidential Inauguration Parade for Barack Obama.  In 2019, the marching band performed in the Rose Parade in Pasadena, California on New Year's Day.

Student media
The FAMUAN – The student newspaper
Journey Magazine – The student magazine
FAMU 20 TV – The FAMU TV news broadcast network
WANM 90.5 FM – The university owned and operated radio station.

Notable alumni

Frederick S. Humphries (born 1935), the eighth president of Florida A&M University from June 1, 1985 to December 31, 2001. Under the Humphries administration, FAMU was selected as "College of the Year" by the TIME/Princeton Review in 1997 and recognized in the State University System as a Comprehensive/Doctoral University in 1999. 
Sybil C. Mobley (born 1925), the founding dean of Florida A&M University'sSchool of Business and Industry. Mobley served on the boards of directors of Anheuser-Busch Company, Champion International Corporation, Hershey Foods Corporation, Sears Roebuck & Company, Southwestern Bell Corporation, Dean Witter, and Discover. 
Bob Hayes (born 1942), the only athlete to win both an Olympic gold medal and a Super Bowl ring. He was once considered the "world's fastest human" by virtue of his multiple world records in the 60-yard, 100-yard, 220-yard, and Olympic 100-meter dashes.
Bernard Kinsey (born 1943), Los Angeles philanthropist and entrepreneur with a passion for African-American history and art of the 19th and 20h centuries
David Scott (Georgia politician) (born 1945), politician and businessman who has served as the U.S. representative for Georgia's 13th congressional district since 2003
Shirley Kinsey (born 1946), Los Angeles-based philanthropist, art collector, and former school teacher known, along with husband Bernard and son Khalil, as the owner of Kinsey Collection, one of the largest private collections of African-American history and art in the world.
Al Lawson (born 1948), politician who served as the U.S. representative for Florida's 5th congressional district, serving from 2017 to 2023
John W. Thompson (born 1949), technology executive who was the chair of Microsoft from 2014 until June 2021
Andre Dawson (born 1954), 8-time National League All-Star, NL MVP, and Baseball Hall of Fame inductee
Pam Oliver (born 1960/1961), sportscaster known for her work on the sidelines for various National Basketball Association (NBA) and National Football League (NFL) games
T'Keyah Crystal Keymáh (born 1962), actress and singer
Kimberly Godwin, former professor at Florida A&M University. In April 2021, Godwin was named president of ABC News. She is the first Black woman to lead a major American network's broadcast news division
Keisha Lance Bottoms (born 1970), attorney and politician who served as the 60th mayor of Atlanta, Georgia, from 2018 to 2022
Common (rapper) (born 1972), known by his stage name Common (also known as Common Sense), is rapper and actor
Anika Noni Rose (born 1972), actress and singer. She is best known for voicing Tiana, Disney's first African-American princess, as seen in The Princess and the Frog (2009). She was named a Disney Legend in 2011
Will Packer (born 1974), film producer often known for hit big-screen comedies including Think Like a Man (2012), Ride Along (2014), Think Like a Man Too (2014), The Wedding Ringer (2015), Girls Trip (2017), Night School (2018), and What Men Want (2019)
Sylvia Lyons Render (1913–1986), English professor and manuscript curator at the Library of Congress; first African American to receive a doctoral degree from the Vanderbilt Peabody College of Education and Human Development
Andrew Gillum (born 1979), nominee for governor of Florida from the Democratic Party and 126th mayor of Tallahassee, Florida
Karamo Brown (born 1980), host of Queer Eye
K. Michelle (born 1982), R&B singer, songwriter, and television personality
 Ibram X Kendi (born 1982), author, professor, anti-racist activist, and historian of race and discriminatory policy in America
Amin Stevens (born 1990), basketball player in the Israeli Basketball Premier League

Notable faculty

See also

List of Florida Agricultural and Mechanical University alumni
Florida Classic

Notes

References

External links

Official athletics website

 
Land-grant universities and colleges
Historically black universities and colleges in the United States
Public universities and colleges in Florida
Universities and colleges accredited by the Southern Association of Colleges and Schools
Universities and colleges in Leon County, Florida
Education in Tallahassee, Florida
Historic districts on the National Register of Historic Places in Florida
National Register of Historic Places in Tallahassee, Florida
Tourist attractions in Tallahassee, Florida
Educational institutions established in 1887
1887 establishments in Florida
African-American tourist attractions in Florida